Top Girls Fassa Bortolo is a professional cycling team based in Italy, which competes in elite road bicycle racing events such as the UCI Women's World Tour.

Team history
On 5 November 2014, Francesca Cauz left the team to join . On 19 November 2014, the team signed Elena Leonardi, Nicole dal Santo and Rossella Callovi, as well as signing contract extensions with; Asja Paladin, Soraya Paladin, Chiara Pierobon, Jennifer Fiori, Irene Bitto and Sara Grifi. Natasha Grillo left the team and Silvia Cecchini retired.

Team roster

Major results

2005
Stage 1b Tour de l'Ardèche, Tania Belvederesi
2006
Brissago, Fabiana Luperini
Giro del Lago Maggiore — GP Knorr, Fabiana Luperini
GP Costa Etrusca, Fabiana Luperini
Giro del Friuli Donne, Fabiana Luperini
 Overall Emakumeen Euskal Bira, Fabiana Luperini
Stage 2, Tatiana Guderzo
Stage 3a, Fabiana Luperini
2008
Lancy, Alessandra D'Ettore
Stage 1 Tour de Pologne Feminin, Alessandra D'Ettore
2009
Cham, Alessandra D'Ettore
2013
 Young rider classification Giro d'Italia Femminile, Francesca Cauz
2016
Gran Premio Hotel Fiera Bolzano, Nadia Quagliotto
2017
Gran Premio Hotel Fiera Bolzano, Nadia Quagliotto
Trofeo Prealpi in Rosa, Nadia Quagliotto
2018
Memorial Valeria Cappellotto, Laura Tomasi
Giro Dei Due Comuni – Memorial Chiara Pierobon, Laura Tomasi
Grand Prix Industry and Commerce of Bottanuco, Laura Tomasi
Stage 3 Giro delle Marche, Laura Tomasi
2021
Stage 2 Giro della Toscana Int. Femminile, Giorgia Bariani
 Mountains classification Festival Elsy Jacobs, Debora Silvestri

National champions

2005
 Italy Time Trial, Tatiana Guderzo
2006
 Italy Road Race, Fabiana Luperini
 Spain Time Trial, Eneritz Iturriaga
2011
 Italy Track (Individual Pursuit), Silvia Valsecchi
 Italy Track (Team Pursuit), Silvia Valsecchi
 Italy Track (Team Pursuit), Gloria Presti
 Italy Track (Team Pursuit), Simona Frapporti
2017
 Romania Road Race, Ana Covrig
 Romania Time Trial, Ana Covrig
2019
 Croatia Road Race, Maja Perinović
 Croatia U23 Time Trial, Maja Perinović
2020
 Croatia Road Race, Maja Perinović
 Croatia U23 Time Trial, Maja Perinović

References

External links

Cycling teams based in Italy
UCI Women's Teams
Cycling teams established in 2005
2005 establishments in Italy